X Games XVII was an action sporting event which took place from July 28 – 31, 2011 in Los Angeles, California. Venues for the event include the Staples Center, Nokia Theater, and other areas of L.A. Live. The games featured the sports of motocross, skateboarding, BMX, and rallying. X Games 17 was also the first ever X Games to feature Enduro X, which replaced Super X.

Results

Moto X

* Competition decided by fan text message voting.

Skateboarding

BMX

Rallying

Medal table

Highlights
Travis Pastrana breaks bones in his foot and ankle in a crash suffered in Moto X Best Trick. Despite the injury, Pastrana competes in RallyCross three days later using hand controls mounted to the steering wheel.
Jackson Strong successfully lands the first front-flip in competition history in Moto X Best Trick, winning the gold.
Steve McCann lands the second no-handed-900 in competition history, but Jamie Bestwick defeats him to win his 5th consecutive gold medal in BMX Freestyle Vert.
14-year-old Mitchie Brusco successfully lands a 900 while practicing for the Skateboard Big Air finals, but he fails to pull off the feat in competition.
16-year-old Nyjah Huston wins gold in Skateboard Street.
Shaun White comes from behind to defeat three time defending champion Pierre-Luc Gagnon in the final round of Skateboard Vert.

References

External links
XGames.com

X Games in Los Angeles
2011 in American sports
2011 in rallying
2011 in multi-sport events